FC Jokerit was a Finnish professional football club based in Helsinki, Finland.

History
It was founded in 1999. The club was known for its wild supporters, 116% Boys, and for its owner, Hjallis Harkimo who is also the owner of Jokerit, an ice hockey club based in Helsinki.

FC Jokerit's last season of football was in 2003, finishing 10th in Veikkausliiga. The club was sold to rivals HJK Helsinki in March 2004, renamed to Klubi-04 and established in Kakkonen.

Reformation
Jokerit F.C. Helsinki were formed in 2012 and participate in the Tali Halli TM league. Because of the sale and reformation of the original Jokerit, Jokerit FC (or JFC Helsinki) consider HJK Helsinki and Klubi-04 as rivals, despite the fact that they rarely play each other due to the divisions between them.

Managers

Achievements

References

Defunct football clubs in Finland
Football clubs in Helsinki
Association football clubs established in 1999
Association football clubs disestablished in 2004
1999 establishments in Finland
2004 disestablishments in Finland

nl:FC Jokerit Helsinki